The Paul Robeson Residence, also known by its street address of 555 Edgecombe Avenue, is a National Historic Landmarked apartment building, located at 555 Edgecombe Avenue at the corner of West 160th Street in the Washington Heights neighborhood of Manhattan, New York City. It was originally known as the "Roger Morris" when it was built in 1914-16 – after the retired British Army officer who built the nearby Morris-Jumel Mansion – and was designed by Schwartz & Gross, who specialized in apartment buildings.  The building is architecturally relatively non-descript, with an exterior of brick and stone with nods to Beaux Arts architectural elements.  It has thirteen floors and a penthouse.  The main entrance is two stories in height, set in an arched opening with ironwork at the peak.

For the first 25 years of its existence, the building was restricted to white tenants. Around 1940, as the racial characteristics of the neighborhood changed, this policy was dropped.  Subsequently, the building became known for the noted African-American residents, including musician and composer Count Basie, boxer Joe Louis, musician Bruce Langhorne, musician and bandleader Andy Kirk, actor and producer Canada Lee, the psychologist Kenneth Clark,  and the actor and singer Paul Robeson, a major figure of stage and screen who lived in the building from 1939 to 1941.

After Robeson's death in 1976, the building was declared a National Historic Landmark in his honor.  In 1993, it was designated a New York City landmark.  Edgecombe Avenue has also been co-named "Paul Robeson Boulevard".

See also
List of New York City Landmarks
National Register of Historic Places listings in Manhattan above 110th Street
List of National Historic Landmarks in New York City

References
Notes

External links
 
 
 

Residential buildings completed in 1916
National Historic Landmarks in Manhattan
Residential buildings on the National Register of Historic Places in Manhattan
Paul Robeson
Washington Heights, Manhattan
New York City Designated Landmarks in Manhattan